Migirpa was an ancient Roman-Berber civitas in the province of Africa Proconsularis. It flourished from 30 BCE to 640 CE. The town is identified as stone ruins near Carthage, Tunisia.

Church use 
Migirpa was also the seat of an ancient Christian diocese, an episcopal see, suffragan of the Archdiocese of Carthage. The Diocese of Migirpa (in Latin Rite Migirpensis) is a home suppressed and titular see of the Roman Catholic Church.  There were five bishops documented in late antiquity at Migirpa and four in the 21st century.

Felix of Migirpa,(also called Prime) took part in the Council of Carthage (256) by St. Cyprian to discuss the question of the lapsi.
Tutus participated in the Council of Carthage (397).
Victor or Vittore, the Catholic representative at the Council of Carthage (411).
Glorius the Donatist representative at the Council of Carthage (411).
Pascasio who attended the Synod of Carthage (484) called by Vandal king Huneric, after which Pascasio was exiled to Corsica.
Today Migirpa survives as a home suppressed and titular see of the Catholic Church. The current bishop is Andris Kravalis, of Riga.
Martin Wiesend (1967–2003)
Daniel Joseph Bohan (2003–2005)
Jude Joseph Tyson (2005–2011) known for his progressive views within the church.
Michael Gerber (June 12, 2013 - December 13, 2018)
Andris Kravalis (since March 8, 2019)

References

Ancient Berber cities
Catholic titular sees in Africa
Former Roman Catholic dioceses in Africa
Roman towns and cities in Tunisia
Archaeological sites in Tunisia